On April 17, 2022, two teenagers were killed and 14 people were injured in a mass shooting at a house party in Pittsburgh, Pennsylvania, United States. The attack has gradually become a cold case, with no arrests or charges being filed as of February 2023.

Shooting 
The party was taking place at an Airbnb rental in the East Allegheny neighborhood, in violation of an Airbnb policy that forbade parties. Around 200 people, mostly minors, were attending the party.

Around 12:30 AM, the party was interrupted with around 50 shots of gunfire, which hit 8 people. Partygoers tried to escape the scene, smashing objects and jumping out of windows during the process. Many people were accidentally injured as they tried to flee. A witness who hid three girls in his car said he had heard loud sounds which he initially believed were fireworks, but then realized were actually gunshots after seeing people fleeing the scene.

Multiple guns were used in the shooting, leading police to suspect that more than one gunman was responsible. ShotSpotter however estimated that number of rounds used to be around 90, and many witnesses insisted the number was higher.

Two teenage boys, both 17 years old, died of their injuries later in the hospital. The party's host was banned for life from Airbnb, which does not permit partying nor allows people under 18 to hold accounts.

As of February 2023, no one has been charged for the shooting.

See also
List of mass shootings in the United States in 2022
List of unsolved murders

Notes

References 

2022 in Pennsylvania
2022 mass shootings in the United States
2022 murders in the United States
2022 shooting
2022 shooting
April 2022 crimes in the United States
Mass shootings in Pennsylvania
Mass shootings in the United States
Unsolved murders in the United States